The 2018 season was São Paulo's 89th year since the club's existence. Due previous year playing for remaining in first division of national league, the club started his performance at state league, Campeonato Paulista, mistrusted by his own fans and media. The head coach Dorival Júnior was fired after 5 losses in only 14 matches, being defeated by all main rivals in just a month. To replace Dorival, São Paulo selected the Uruguayan Diego Aguirre, a former forward who was in the club for a short period of time in 1990. Despite the elimination in the semifinals of Campeonato Paulista and second round of Copa Sudamericana, Aguirre did a consistent job in the early months leading the team. In the first half of league São Paulo ended in first place holding its performance for 8 rounds at the middle of competition. However a couple of draws and the rise of his rival Palmeiras, took place from São Paulo that dropped down in table 4 positions finishing his participation in 5th. Diego Aguirre was fired in the 33rd round after an away draw against Corinthians by 1-1. For the interim charge André Jardine trained the club in the last 5 matches, he was announced as the head coach for 2019.

Players

Current squad

Transfers

In

Out

Out on loan

Statistics

Top scorers

Managers performance

Overview

{|class="wikitable"
|-
|Games played || 64 (16 Campeonato Paulista, 6 Copa do Brasil, 4 Copa Sudamericana, 38 Campeonato Brasileiro)
|-
|Games won || 29 (7 Campeonato Paulista, 4 Copa do Brasil, 2 Copa Sudamericana, 16 Campeonato Brasileiro)
|-
|Games drawn || 19 (2 Campeonato Paulista, 1 Copa do Brasil, 1 Copa Sudamericana, 15 Campeonato Brasileiro)
|-
|Games lost || 16 (7 Campeonato Paulista, 1 Copa do Brasil, 1 Copa Sudamericana, 7 Campeonato Brasileiro)
|-
|Goals scored || 74
|-
|Goals conceded || 52
|-
|Goal difference || +22
|-
|Best result ||  3−0 (A) v CRB − Copa do Brasil 3−0 (H) v Vitória − Campeonato Brasileiro
|-
|Worst result ||  1−3 (A) v Palmeiras − Campeonato Brasileiro  1−3 (A) v Internacional − Campeonato Brasileiro
|-
|Top scorer || Diego Souza (16)
|-

Official competitions

Campeonato Paulista

Group B

First stage

Quarterfinals

Semifinals

Copa do Brasil

Copa Sudamericana

First stage

Second stage

Campeonato Brasileiro Série A

Results summary

Results by round

References

External links
 official website

São Paulo FC seasons
Sao Paulo F.C.